Rod Pelley (born September 1, 1984) is a Canadian former professional ice hockey centre. After his collegiate career, Pelley signed as a free agent with the New Jersey Devils, and was with the organization from 2006 to 2011. He was traded to the Anaheim Ducks on December 12, 2011.

Playing career
Pelley was born in Kitimat, BC, Canada, where he attended St. Anthony's Elementary School and Mount Elizabeth Secondary School. At the age of 16, Pelley moved on to play hockey in the BCHL, first with the Prince George Spruce Kings, finishing his BCHL career with the Vernon Vipers. He then went on to play NCAA Division 1 Hockey on an athletic scholarship for the Buckeyes of the Ohio State University. Pelley graduated with a degree in Sports Management in 2006.

After his collegiate career, Pelley signed as a free agent with the New Jersey Devils. He scored his first NHL goal on November 8, 2007 against Martin Biron of the Philadelphia Flyers.

With New Jersey's AHL affiliate, the Lowell Devils in the 2008–09 season, Pelley contributed 38 points in 75 games. He then played his first full season in the NHL in 2009–10 with New Jersey.

On December 12, 2011, Pelley, along with Mark Fraser and a 2012 7th round draft pick, was traded to the Anaheim Ducks in exchange for Kurtis Foster and Timo Pielmeier. New Jersey Devils GM, Lou Lamoriello spoke about the trade: "When you have such quality individuals (like Pelley and Fraser) who've given you so much each and every day in practice and in the locker room as support, you try and do the best for them. This is a win situation for both teams. They're getting two role players who will be tremendous for them and we're getting a player who has tremendous upside in the role we see that he'll fit."

A free agent with the 2012 NHL lock-out in place, Pelley signed midway into the 2012–13 season to a professional try-out contract with the Ducks' affiliate, the Norfolk Admirals of the AHL on November 23, 2012.

After the season with the Admirals, Pelley signed a one-year deal worth $550,000 to return to the New Jersey Devils. He played the next four seasons leading the Devils AHL affiliate in  Albany.

As a free agent, Pelly opted to continue in the AHL signing a one-year deal with the Stockton Heat and agreeing to an invite to participate with NHL affiliate, the Calgary Flames training camp. On September 19, 2017, Pelley was re-assigned by the Flames to the Heat.

After a solitary season with the Heat, Pelley left North America as a free agent, securing a one-year contract with Danish club, SønderjyskE Ishockey of the Metal Ligaen on July 24, 2018. Pelley continued his European career the following season, playing with Romanian club, HSC Csíkszereda of the Erste Liga. 

Having played 14 professional seasons, Pelley announced his retirement from hockey in September 2020.

Career statistics

Awards and honours

References

External links
 

1984 births
Living people
Albany Devils players
Anaheim Ducks players
Canadian expatriate ice hockey players in the United States
Canadian ice hockey centres
HSC Csíkszereda players
Ice hockey people from British Columbia
Lowell Devils players
New Jersey Devils players
Norfolk Admirals players
Ohio State Buckeyes men's ice hockey players
People from Kitimat
Prince George Spruce Kings players
SønderjyskE Ishockey players
Stockton Heat players
Undrafted National Hockey League players
Vernon Vipers players
Canadian expatriate ice hockey players in Romania
Canadian expatriate ice hockey players in Denmark